cAMP-regulated phosphoprotein 19 is a protein that in humans is encoded by the ARPP19 gene.

References

External links

Further reading